Bernard Rose may refer to:

Bernard Rose (director), British film director
Bernard Rose (musician), British organist and composer
Bernard Rose (athlete), South African long-distance runner